Svirce is a village in the south of municipality of Medveđa, Serbia. Until the 1999 Kosovo War it had 1300 people, the largest village in population in Medvedja municipality after the town of Medvedja itself. According to the 2002 census, the village has a population of 501 people. Of these, 499 were ethnic Albanians, and 2 others.

References

See also
 geoSerbia, geographic portal of Serbia

Populated places in Jablanica District
Albanian communities in Serbia